Kentucky Route 194 (KY 194) is an  state highway in Kentucky that runs from Kentucky Route 1428 east of Emma to Virginia State Route 697 at the Virginia state line south of Argo via Woods, Kimper, Phyllis, Phelps, Freeburn, Majestic, and Stopover.

KY 194 is part of the Rural Secondary System from KY 1428 to the intersection with Sycamore Road at the Mountain Public Links golf course (between McCombs and Mayflover), and the State Secondary System the rest of the way to Virginia.

Major intersections

Freeburn spur

Kentucky Route 194 Spur (KY 194 Spur) is a  spur route of KY 194 that connects to West Virginia State Route 49 at the West Virginia state line in Freeburn.

Major intersections

References

0194
Transportation in Floyd County, Kentucky
Transportation in Pike County, Kentucky